Gola, Nepal is a village development committee in Bardiya District in Lumbini Province of south-western Nepal. At the time of the 1991 Nepal census it had a population of 5,340 and had 694 houses in the town.

References

Populated places in Bardiya District